The Battle of Słupcza took place on February 8, 1863, near the village of Słupcza, Congress Poland, during the January Uprising. The skirmish was won by the Russians.

In late January 1863, an insurgent unit, which was concentrated in Kurów, was forced to leave the town under Russian pressure. Polish unit marched to Sandomierz, but decided not to enter this town, and clashed with Russians near Słupcza. The Russians attacked with two infantry companies and a Cossack unit, defeating main insurgent force. Remnants of Polish insurgents fled to Dwikozy, where they were attacked again. All together, Poles lost 66 men - 28 died in Słupcza, and 38 perished in Dwikozy. Polish commandant Leon Frankowski, who was wounded, tried to hide in Sandomierz, but was quickly captured and sent to a prison in Lublin.

Sources 
 Stefan Kieniewicz: Powstanie styczniowe. Warszawa: Państwowe Wydawnictwo Naukowe, 1983. .

Conflicts in 1863
1863 in Poland
Slupcza
February 1863 events
Radom Governorate